Roger William Denton (born 6 January 1953) is an English former professional footballer who played as a full back.

Career
Born in Stretford, Denton played for Manchester United, Bolton Wanderers, Bradford City and Rochdale.

For Bolton Wanderers he made 4 appearances in the Football League.

For Bradford City he made 30 appearances in the Football League; he also made three appearances in the FA Cup.

For Rochdale he made two appearances in the Football League.

Sources

References

1953 births
Living people
English footballers
Manchester United F.C. players
Bolton Wanderers F.C. players
Bradford City A.F.C. players
Rochdale A.F.C. players
English Football League players
Association football fullbacks